Ernesto Terra (born 28 May 1978) is an Italian footballer who plays for Monte San Giovanni Campano.

Career
Terra started his career at Eccellenza side Renato Curi. He then played 5 seasons for Sere C1 side Sora. In 2003, he was signed by Calcio Catania by spent next two seasons on loan at Serie B for Pescara and Atalanta. In 2006, he was signed by Arezzo of Serie B. On 30 July 2010, he was signed for free by Sorrento after being released by Arezzo.

External links
http://aic.football.it/scheda/4639/terra-ernesto.htm
http://www.gazzetta.it/speciali/serie_b/2008_nw/giocatori/56404.shtml

Italian footballers
Serie B players
Catania S.S.D. players
Delfino Pescara 1936 players
Atalanta B.C. players
S.S. Arezzo players
F.C. Grosseto S.S.D. players
A.S.D. Sorrento players
Association football defenders
People from Teramo
1978 births
Living people
Sportspeople from the Province of Teramo
Footballers from Abruzzo